Marie-Francine Hébert (born March 24, 1943) is a Canadian author from Quebec.

Born in Montreal, she writes mainly for younger audiences. Besides books, Hébert also writes for the stage and for television.

In 2015, she was chosen by the Centre québécois de ressources en littérature pour la jeunesse of the Bibliothèque et Archives nationales du Québec as a candidate for the Astrid Lindgren Memorial Award.

Selected works

Youth literature 
  Le cœur en bataille (1990)
 Je t'aime, je te hais (1991)
  Sauve qui peut l'amour (1992)
 Décroche-moi la lune (2001), received the Mr. Christie's Book Award
 Mon rayon de soleil (2002), received the Mr. Christie's Book Award and the Prix Alvine-Bélisle
 Nul poisson où aller (2002), received the Prix Alvine-Bélisle and the 
 Le ciel tombe à côté (2003), received the Mr. Christie's Book Award

Theatre 
 Cé tellement cute des enfants (1980)
 Oui ou Non (1988), was a finalist for a Governor General's Awards for Literary Merit in 1988

Television 
 Iniminimagimo
 
 Les quatre saisons dans la vie de Ludovic

References

External links 
 

1943 births
Living people
Canadian children's writers in French
Writers from Montreal
Canadian women dramatists and playwrights
Canadian women screenwriters
Canadian dramatists and playwrights in French
20th-century Canadian dramatists and playwrights
20th-century Canadian women writers
Canadian women children's writers